State Route 280 (SR 280) is a  east-west state highway in northern Coffee County, Tennessee. It serves as a connection between the communities of Beechgrove and Pocahontas. It also serves the community of Lakewood Park.

Route description

SR 280 begins in Beechgrove at an intersection with US 41/SR 2 at the southern edge of the community. It winds its way east through the hills of the Highland Rim for several miles before turning southeast through farmland. The highway then turns east again entering the community of Lakewood Park along Gnat Hill Road, with some maps listing this as Noah-Pocahontas Road, to pass through rural areas to enter Pocahontas, where SR 280 comes to an end at an intersection with SR 53. The entire route of SR 280 is a rural two-lane highway.

Major intersections

References

280
Transportation in Coffee County, Tennessee